Michael V. Smith is a Canadian novelist, poet and filmmaker, originally from Cornwall, Ontario and now living in Kelowna, British Columbia. His debut novel, Cumberland, was nominated for the Books in Canada First Novel Award in 2002. He has also been a nominee for the Journey Prize and the inaugural winner of the Dayne Ogilvie Prize, and has published two books of poetry, What You Can't Have and Body of Text, and a memoir, My Body Is Yours.

Smith, openly gay, is a graduate of the University of British Columbia's Creative Writing program. He has also made a number of short films, several of which have garnered awards from the Inside Out Film and Video Festival in Toronto, Ontario. He teaches at the University of British Columbia Okanagan Campus in the interdisciplinary Faculty of Creative and Critical Studies.

He served on the jury of the 2012 Dayne Ogilvie Prize, selecting Amber Dawn as that year's winner.

Smith also formerly performed as a drag queen, under the stage name Miss Cookie LaWhore.

Bibliography

Novels
 Cumberland (2002)
 Progress (2011)

Poetry
 What You Can't Have (2007)
 Body of Text (2008)
 Bad Ideas (2017)

Memoir
 My Body Is Yours (2015 )

References

External links
 Michael V. Smith

Canadian memoirists
Canadian male novelists
21st-century Canadian poets
21st-century Canadian novelists
Canadian male short story writers
Canadian gay writers
Writers from Vancouver
Living people
People from Cornwall, Ontario
Writers from Ontario
Canadian LGBT poets
Canadian LGBT novelists
Gay memoirists
Canadian male poets
21st-century Canadian short story writers
21st-century Canadian male writers
Canadian male non-fiction writers
Year of birth missing (living people)
21st-century memoirists
Gay poets
Gay novelists
21st-century Canadian LGBT people